Carl Hermann Kraeling (1897–1966), an American theologian, historian, and archaeologist; born in Brooklyn on March 10, 1897, and died in New Haven on November 14, 1966; he is known for his publications on the synagogue and the Christian chapel of Dura-Europos.

He studied at Columbia University, and earned his B.D. from the Lutheran Theological Seminary in Philadelphia in 1926. He taught New Testament Studies at the Yale University and established the department of Near Eastern languages and Civilizations there.

Kraeling served as the president of the American Schools of Oriental Research (ASOR) from 1949 to 1954. He supported the continued study of the Dead Sea Scrolls, and encouraged humanitarian awareness for Near Eastern refugees during a turbulent period in the area's history. He was elected a member of the American Philosophical Society in 1958.

Works 

 Anthropos and Son of Man (1937)
 Gerasa, City of the Decapolis (1938)
 John the Baptist, (New York, 1951)
 The Synagogue, The Excavations at Dura-Europos, Final Report VIII.1 (New Haven, 1956)

References

Bibliography 

 J. S. Thacher, "Carl H. Kraeling (1897-1966)", Dumbarton Oaks Papers, 21 (1967), 7 ;
 W. F. Albright, "Carl Herman Kraeling: In Memoriam", Bulletin of the American Schools of Oriental Research, 189 (avril 1970), 4-7.
 William F. Albright, Carl Herman Kraeling – In Menoriam The American Schools of Oriental Research (1970), p. 4 ff

1897 births
1966 deaths
American Christian theologians
People from Brooklyn
Columbia University alumni
Yale University faculty
20th-century American historians
20th-century American male writers
20th-century American archaeologists
Historians from New York (state)
American male non-fiction writers
Members of the American Philosophical Society